Penelope Gazin is an artist, animator and entrepreneur based in Los Angeles. She is the co-founder of Witchsy, an Etsy-like online marketplace for darkly humorous, bizarre and kitschy art.

Gazin and co-founder Kate Dwyer received media attention in 2017 for their story of inventing a fake co-founder for Witchsy, "Keith Mann", and the subsequent success they experienced when investors thought they had a male business partner.

Gazin appeared in photographer Parker Day's 2017 portrait series ICONS.

References 

Living people
American women artists
American illustrators
American women animators
American women illustrators
American businesspeople
American women in business
Animators from California
Year of birth missing (living people)
21st-century American women